Connolly is a surname of Irish origin. Notable people with the surname include:

 Alan Connolly (cricketer) (born 1939), Australian cricketer
 Billy Connolly (born 1942), Scottish comedian
 Brett Connolly (born 1992), Canadian professional ice hockey player
 Brian Connolly (1945–1997), vocalist for band Sweet
 Chris Connolly (born 1963), coach of the Fremantle Football Club
 C.P. Connolly (born 1863), radical American investigative journalist
 Cyril Connolly (born 1903), English man of letters
 Dan Connolly, multiple people
 David Connolly (born 1977), Irish footballer
 Fintan Connolly, Irish film director and screenwriter 
 Gary Connolly (born 1971), English Rugby League player
 Gerry Connolly (born 1950), United States Congressman from Virginia
 Hal Connolly (1931–2010), American hammer thrower
 Harold Connolly (born 1901), Nova Scotia journalist
 James Connolly, multiple people
 John Connolly, multiple people
 Joseph Connolly, multiple people
 Kevin Connolly (actor) (born 1974), American actor
 Kristen Connolly, an American actress and former professional tennis player
 Mark Connolly, Irish footballer
 Matthew Connolly (born 1987), footballer
 Matthew William Kemble Connolly (1872–1947), a British army officer and malacologist
 Maureen Connolly (1934–1969), American professional tennis player
 Maurice Connolly (born 1877), representative from Iowa
 Megan Connolly, multiple people
 Michael Connolly, multiple people
 Myles Connolly (1897–1964), Writer, Screenwriter, Oscar Nominee (Music for Millions, 1944)
 Nathan Connolly, guitarist for alternative rock band Snow Patrol
 Pat Connolly, multiple people
 Patricia Connolly, Scottish bioengineer
 Patrick Connolly, former Attorney General of Ireland
 Peter Connolly, multiple people
 Richard B. Connolly (1810–1880), New York politician
 Robert Connolly, Australian filmmaker
 Roddy Connolly (born 1901), Irish socialist
 Susan E. Connolly (born ), Irish writer
Stephen S. Connolly Urology Doctor
 Thomas Connolly, multiple people
 Tim Connolly (born 1981), American ice hockey player
 Tyler Connolly, vocalist for band Theory of a Deadman
 Walter Connolly (1887–1940), American character actor
 William Connolly, multiple people

See also 
 John Connally, Governor of Texas, 1963–69
 William Connolley (born 1964), climate modeler and Wikipedian
 Arthur Conolly (born 1807), British intelligence officer
 Edward Conolly (disambiguation), multiple people
 William Conolly (1662–1729), Irish politician and landowner
 , named for the US Navy WW II Admiral Richard Lansing Conolly

See also 
Conley
Connally (disambiguation)
Connelly (surname)
Connolly (disambiguation)

Irish families
Surnames of Irish origin
Anglicised Irish-language surnames
English-language surnames